Northeastern Ontario is a secondary region of Northern Ontario in the Canadian province of Ontario, which lies north of Lake Huron and east of Lake Superior.

Northeastern Ontario consists of the districts of Algoma, Sudbury, Cochrane, Timiskaming, Nipissing and Manitoulin. For some purposes, Parry Sound District and Muskoka District Municipality are treated as part of Northeastern Ontario although they are geographically in Central Ontario. These two divisions are coloured in green on the map.

Northeastern Ontario and Northwestern Ontario may also be grouped together as Northern Ontario. An important difference between the two sub-regions is that Northeastern Ontario has a sizable Franco-Ontarian population — approximately 25 per cent of the region's population speaks French as a first language, compared with 3.2 per cent in the northwest. Virtually the entire region, except only the Manitoulin District, is designated as a French-language service area under Ontario's French Language Services Act. In the northwest, by contrast, only a few standalone municipalities are so designated.

Municipalities

Cities
There are six cities in Northeastern Ontario. They are, in alphabetical order:

Towns

The towns in Northeastern Ontario listed in alphabetical order include.

Transportation
The region is served by several branches of the Trans-Canada Highway, including Highway 11, Highway 17, Highway 66 and Highway 69. Several other highways in the region are part of the provincial highway system, but not the national Trans-Canada Highway.

The only freeways in the region are a portion of Highway 17 in the Walden district of Greater Sudbury, and most but not all of Highway 69 between Greater Sudbury and the French River. The remainder of Highway 69 is slated for conversion into a full freeway, and will be redesignated as part of Highway 400 when the construction is complete. The provincial government also has plans on file for the eventual conversion of Highway 17 to freeway from Sault Ste. Marie easterly toward Ottawa, although no timetable for this project has been announced as of 2018 except for the conversion of Highway 17's Southwest and Southeast Bypasses route through Sudbury near the completion of the Highway 69/400 project.

Population

Provincial parks
List of Ontario provincial parks in Northeastern Ontario

References

Geography of Northern Ontario